Gottfried Fritzsche (real name Frietzsch) (1578 – 1638)  was a German organ builder.

Life 
Born in Meissen, Frietzsch wrote himself with a stretched IE. Research in the 20th century, however, consistently referred to him as "Fritzsche". He was born the son of the goldsmith Jobst Fritzsche (died 1585). His grandfather Johannes Fritzsche (1508-1586) was cathedral syndic in Meissen. Before 1603 he probably learned organ building from Johann Lange in Kamenz. Fritzsche was an organ builder in Meissen until 1612, then in Dresden. There he was appointed court organ builder to the Elector of Saxony around 1614. From 1619 to 1627, he worked in Wolfenbüttel and from 1628 to 1629 in Celle, before coming to Ottensen in 1629. He succeeded Hans Scherer the Younger and remained there until his death.

His first marriage to a woman who is no longer known by name produced three sons and three daughters, including the organ builder Hans Christoph Fritzsche. Through his second marriage in 1629 to Margarete née Ringemuth, widowed Rist, he became the stepfather of the poet Johann Rist. His pupils (and later sons-in-law) were Friederich Stellwagen and Tobias Brunner.

Work 
Fritzsche stood on the threshold from the Renaissance to the early Baroque. He further developed Brabant organ building and introduced numerous innovations, for example, on the Zungenregister the rackett regals such as dulzian, regal, sordun and the long-beaked crumhorn. Fritzsche not infrequently placed stops of the same stop family but with contrasting scales (wide and narrow) in one work or chose unusual foot pitches. In the Brustwerk and pedal he regularly used one-foot voices, which were still unknown with Scherer. Also characteristic is his double zill, which takes the place of Scherer's high-lying Scharff, as well as the use of various  as single voices. For example, the simbel installed by Fritzsche in 1635 in the organ of the St. James' Church, Hamburg was the first of its kind in northern Germany. He also liked to use secondary stops such as tremulant and "drum", which do not yet appear in Scherer's work, and Effect stops such as "Cuckoo", "Birdsong", and "Nightingale". While hammered lead pipes had been the rule in northern Germany until then, Fritzsche planed the pipes and used an alloy with a higher tin content; for the cups of the trombones and trumpets he added marcasite. Compared to Scherer, the use of Subsemitones (double upper keys) was new. During his time in Hamburg, he carried out alterations to the organs of all four main churches. Fritzsche's extensions made the organs in St. Jacobi and St. Katharinen among the first organs ever to have four manuals.

Fritzsche died in Ottensen, modern-day Hamburg.

List of work

References

Further reading 
 Ibo Ortgies: Gottfried Frietzschs Orgelbau in Hamburg: St. Catherine's Church, Hamburg und die Subsemitonien. In . 68, No. 3, 2020, . (This article is a comprehensive update, amendment and extension of the article Gottfried Frietzsch and the Subsemitones in the Large Organ of Hamburg, St. Catherine’s. In Johann Norrback, Joel Speerstra und Ralph Locke (ed.): Festschrift for Prof. Kerala J. Snyder (GOArt Publications. Vol. 4). Göteborgs universitet, Göteborg 2019, 13 S. online (PDF: 1,8 MB)).
 Gisela Jaacks: Fritzsche, Gottfried. In Franklin Kopitzsch, Dirk Brietzke (ed.): . Vol. 5. Wallstein, Göttingen 2010, .
 
 
 Wolfram Steude: Beobachtungen zur Funktion der Dresdner Fritzsche-Orgel im 17. Jahrhundert. In  Matthias Herrmann (ed.): Wolfram Steude, Annäherung durch Distanz. Texte zur älteren mitteldeutschen Musik und Musikgeschichte. Klaus-Jürgen Kamprad, Altenburg 2001, .
 Frank-Harald Greß: Die Gottfried-Fritzsche-Orgel der Dresdner Schloßkapelle. Untersuchungen zur Rekonstruktion ihres Klangbildes. In . Vol. 23, 1993, .
 
 
 
 Wilibald Gurlitt: Der Kursächsische Hoforgelmacher Gottfried Fritzsche. In  Helmuth Osthoff, Walter Serauky, Adam Adrio (ed.): Festschrift Arnold Schering zum 60. Geburtstag. Reprint Georg Olms Verlag, Berlin 1937, .
 Hans Klotz: Fritzsche, Gottfried. In Friedrich Blume (ed.): Die Musik in Geschichte und Gegenwart. Vol. 4, Bärenreiter, Kassel [among others] 1955, Sp. 978–982.

External links 
 Christian Lobback: Hanseatischer Orgelbau im Licht des 21. Jahrhunderts, particularly the chapter Die Reformorgeln Gottfried Fritzsches
 Dorothea Schröder: Orgeln und Orgelbau im Herzogtum Wolfenbüttel 1580–1650  (PDF-Datei; 427 kB)

 

German pipe organ builders
1578 births
1638 deaths
People from Meissen